The Indian cricket team toured Sri Lanka, playing three Test matches from 18 July to 7 August 2010.

Squads 
The squads of the four teams participating in the tournament were announced in early June by the respective cricket boards.

Test Series

1st Test

2nd Test

3rd Test

Tour Match

Sri Lanka Board President's XI vs Indians

Media Coverage

Television 
 Ten Sports : India, Pakistan, Middle East, Indonesia, Hong Kong and Singapore
 Zee cafe : England and Wales
 SuperSport (South African broadcaster) : South Africa, Kenya and Zimbabwe
 Setanta Sports Australia : Australia
 Sri Lanka Rupavahini Corporation : Sri Lanka
 Sky Network Television : New Zealand

Internet 
http://www.srilankacricket.lk – Online commentary only

References

External links 
 Tour home at ESPN Cricinfo

2010 in Indian cricket
2010 in Sri Lankan cricket
2010
International cricket competitions in 2010
Sri Lankan cricket seasons from 2000–01